The Finnish Junior Curling Championships is the national championships of men's and women's junior curling teams in Finland. Junior level curlers must be under the age of 21. The championships have been held annually since 1998 for junior men and since 2005 for junior women, organized by Finnish Curling Association.

List of champions and medallists
Teams line-up in order: skip/fourth, third, second, lead, alternate, coach; skips marked bold.

Men

Women

References

See also
Finnish Men's Curling Championship
Finnish Women's Curling Championship
Finnish Mixed Curling Championship
Finnish Mixed Doubles Curling Championship
Finnish Wheelchair Curling Championship

Curling competitions in Finland
Curling
Recurring sporting events established in 1998
Recurring sporting events established in 2005
National curling championships
1998 establishments in Finland
2005 establishments in Finland
Youth sport in Finland
National youth sports competitions
Youth curling